Andrew Weiner (17 June 1949 – 3 December 2019) was a Canadian science fiction writer.  He published three novels and over forty short stories.

Weiner was born in London, United Kingdom, where he graduated in social psychology from the London School of Economics. He emigrated to Canada in 1974.

Bibliography

Novels
Station Gehenna (1987)
Getting Near the End (2004, first publication in French under the title En approchant de la fin, 2000)
Among the Missing (2006, only published in French, under the title Boulevard des disparus)

Short story collections
Distant Signals: And Other Stories (1989)
This is the Year Zero (1998)

Anthologized short stories
His short story "Empire of the Sun"—his first professional sale—was included in Again, Dangerous Visions (1972) edited by Harlan Ellison, and his
"Klein's Machine" appeared in Future on Ice (1998) edited by Orson Scott Card.

References

External links

1949 births
2019 deaths
Canadian science fiction writers
Canadian fantasy writers
English emigrants to Canada
Writers from London